Michael Gwynne Beamish (born 30 July 1969) is a South African former cricketer. He played in 32 first-class matches for Eastern Province from 1993/94 to 1998/99.

See also
 List of Eastern Province representative cricketers

References

External links
 

1969 births
Living people
South African cricketers
Eastern Province cricketers
Sportspeople from Qonce